Évanturel (2016 population 449) is a township in Timiskaming District, Ontario, Canada.  It almost completely surrounds the town of Englehart. The main settlement in Évanturel is the community of Heaslip.

It was named after François-Eugène-Alfred Évanturel, the first Francophone speaker for the Ontario legislative assembly.

Kap-Kig-Iwan Provincial Park is partially located in the township.

Demographics 

Mother tongue:
 English as first language: 84%
 French as first language: 14%
 English and French as first language: 0%
 Other as first language: 3%

See also
List of townships in Ontario
List of francophone communities in Ontario

References

External links

 Official website

Municipalities in Timiskaming District
Single-tier municipalities in Ontario
Township municipalities in Ontario